Charles Frederick Murphy (April 13, 1875 in Norwood, St. Lawrence County, New York – June 19, 1934 in Danbury, Fairfield County, Connecticut) was an American politician from New York.

Life
He attended Norwood Academy and Potsdam Normal School. He was a graduate of Union College in Schenectady, New York, and of the New York Law School. He was admitted to the bar in 1903.

Murphy was a member of the New York State Assembly (Kings Co., 10th D.) in 1905, 1906, 1907, 1908 and 1909; and was Chairman of the Committee on Codes in 1908 and 1909. In 1909, he married Jeannette Grey Hutchinson.

He was a member of the New York State Senate (6th D.) in 1917 and 1918.

Murphy was appointed Special Deputy Attorney General in 1926 to represent the State in Washington before the American-British Arbitration Tribunal.

He died on June 19, 1934, in Danbury Hospital in Danbury, Connecticut, from his injuries after having been hit by a car. The accident occurred as Murphy was walking alongside the Route 22 near his summer home, in Brewster, New York.

References

Sources
 Official New York from Cleveland to Hughes by Charles Elliott Fitch (Hurd Publishing Co., New York and Buffalo, 1911, Vol. IV; pg. 350, 352f, 355 and 357)
 New York Red Book (1918; pg. 113)
 MURPHY 'SHORTAGE' PAID; Brooklyn Republican Leader Gives $16,118 to New Receiver in NYT on November 23, 1933 (subscription required)
 C. F. MURPHY DEAD, EX-STATE SENATOR in NYT on June 20, 1934 (subscription required)

1875 births
1934 deaths
Republican Party New York (state) state senators
Politicians from Brooklyn
Republican Party members of the New York State Assembly
People from St. Lawrence County, New York
Road incident deaths in Connecticut
Pedestrian road incident deaths